"New Ground" is the 110th episode of the American science fiction television series Star Trek: The Next Generation. The tenth episode of the fifth season.

Set in the 24th century, the series follows the adventures of the Starfleet crew of the Federation starship Enterprise-D. In this episode, Worf is less than thrilled when his foster mother, Helena, arrives with his son Alexander. Although Helena and Worf's foster father, Sergey, had agreed to raise the boy after K'Ehleyr's death, Helena now reports that Alexander is having a difficult time adjusting to his new life, and they're not as young as they used to be; he needs to be raised by his father on the Enterprise. Predictably, Worf and Alexander have a difficult time as well adjusting to one another, a situation aggravated by a ship-based experiment that becomes life-threatening. Georgia Brown died just 5½ months after the episode aired.

Plot
Data and Worf do not share La Forge's excitement about the first trial run of soliton wave transportation technology that the Enterprise will be assisting with. La Forge notes that witnessing the soliton wave transportation would be like witnessing Zefram Cochrane engage the first warp drive. Worf receives a communication from his human mother who requests to visit bringing his son Alexander. On arrival, they reveal that it was not intended for him to go back. Worf's mother explains that Alexander is too much of a burden on them. After enrolling Alexander in school, Worf finds many new problems with the arrival of his son. Alexander soon lies and steals during a school field trip.

A distortion during the wave transportation experiment damages the Enterprise and the test ship explodes. The wave exponentially increases in power and speed, set on a collision course with a colony at Lemma II.

Alexander continues to cause problems in school while Worf reviews his parenting habits. He contemplates sending Alexander to a Klingon school, believing that it is best. However, Alexander feels he is being rejected by Worf.

The Enterprise dissipates the wave with photon torpedoes. Alexander is saved from a damaged area of the Enterprise by Riker and Worf. Afterwards, Worf lets Alexander stay on the Enterprise.

Releases 
The episode was released in the United States on November 5, 2002, as part of the season five DVD box set. The first Blu-ray release was in the United States on November 18, 2013, followed by the United Kingdom the next day, November 19, 2013.

References

External links
 

Star Trek: The Next Generation (season 5) episodes
1992 American television episodes
Television episode directed by Robert Scheerer